Sachin Bhudia (born 24 September 1998) is a Kenyan cricketer. In December 2017, he was named as the captain of the Kenyan team for the 2018 Under-19 Cricket World Cup.

In October 2018, he was named in Kenya's squad for the 2018 ICC World Cricket League Division Three tournament in Oman. He played in Kenya's opening fixture of the tournament, against Oman on 9 November 2018.

In May 2019, he was named in Kenya's squad for the Regional Finals of the 2018–19 ICC T20 World Cup Africa Qualifier tournament in Uganda. He made his Twenty20 International (T20I) debut for Kenya against Uganda on 22 May 2019. In September 2019, he was named in Kenya's squad for the 2019 ICC T20 World Cup Qualifier tournament in the United Arab Emirates. In November 2019, he was named in Kenya's squad for the Cricket World Cup Challenge League B tournament in Oman. He made his List A debut, for Kenya against Jersey, on 9 December 2019. In November 2022, Bhudia replaced Shem Ngoche as the captain of Kenya. He was named the captain of Kenyan team for the  Africa Regional qualifier for 2024 T20I World Cup

References

External links
 

1998 births
Living people
Kenyan cricketers
Kenya Twenty20 International cricketers
Place of birth missing (living people)